Torture Garden is a 1967 British anthology horror film directed by Freddie Francis and starring Burgess Meredith, Jack Palance, Michael Ripper, Beverly Adams, Peter Cushing, Maurice Denham, Ursula Howells, Michael Bryant and Barbara Ewing. The score was a collaboration between Hammer horror regulars James Bernard and Don Banks.

Made by Amicus Productions, it is one of producer Milton Subotsky's trademark "portmanteau" films, an omnibus of short stories (in this case all by Psycho author Robert Bloch, who adapted his own work for the screenplay) linked by a single narrative.

Plot

Prologue
Five people visit a fairground sideshow run by showman Dr. Diabolo (Burgess Meredith). Having shown them a handful of haunted house-style attractions, he promises them a genuinely scary experience if they will pay extra. Their curiosity gets the better of them, and the small crowd follows him behind a curtain, where they each view their fate through the shears of an effigy of the female deity Atropos (Clytie Jessop).

Segments
 In Enoch, a greedy playboy (Michael Bryant) takes advantage of his dying uncle (Maurice Denham), and falls under the spell of a man-eating cat.
 In Terror Over Hollywood, a Hollywood starlet (Beverly Adams) discovers her co-stars are androids.
 In Mr. Steinway, a possessed Bechstein grand piano by the name of Euterpe becomes jealous of its owner (John Standing)'s new lover (Barbara Ewing) and takes revenge.
 In The Man Who Collected Poe, a Poe collector (Jack Palance) murders another collector (Peter Cushing) over a collectable he refuses to show him, only to find it is Edgar Allan Poe himself (Hedger Wallace).

Epilogue
In an epilogue, the fifth patron (Michael Ripper) goes berserk and uses the shears of Atropos to "kill" Dr. Diabolo in front of the others, causing them to panic and flee. It is then shown that he is working for Diabolo, and the whole thing was faked. As they congratulate each other for their acting, it is then revealed that Palance's character had not run off like the others, and he too commends their performance, sharing a brief exchange with Diabolo and lighting a cigarette for him before leaving (using the same lighter he borrowed in his vision, implying that the events actually happened).  Diabolo puts the shears back into the hand of Atropos, and then breaks the fourth wall by addressing three words to the audience, thereby revealing himself actually to be the devil.

Cast
 Jack Palance as Ronald Wyatt
 Burgess Meredith as Dr. Diabolo
 Beverly Adams as Carla Hayes
 Peter Cushing as Lancelot Canning
 Michael Bryant as Colin Williams
 Barbara Ewing as Dorothy Endicott
 John Standing as Leo
 John Phillips as Storm
 Michael Ripper as Gordon Roberts
 Bernard Kay as Dr. Heim
 Maurice Denham as Uncle Roger
 Ursula Howells as Miss Chambers
 David Bauer as Charles
 Niall MacGinnis as Doctor

Production

Casting
The film was meant to star Peter Cushing and Christopher Lee; however, Columbia, which was providing the budget, wanted two American names, and this led to Palance and Meredith's casting.

Filming
The film was shot at Shepperton Studios, London, England.

Critical reception 
Allmovie's review of the film was mixed, writing, "Torture Garden lacks the strength and inventiveness to qualify as a top-tier horror anthology but it offers enough spooky thrills to qualify as a Saturday afternoon diversion."

References

External links

Film Review

1967 films
1960s fantasy films
1967 horror films
British horror films
Films directed by Freddie Francis
Amicus Productions films
British anthology films
British horror anthology films
British supernatural horror films
British science fiction horror films
Android (robot) films
Columbia Pictures films
The Devil in film
Demons in film
Films about cats
Films based on short fiction
Films based on multiple works
Films based on works by Robert Bloch
Films scored by James Bernard
Films with screenplays by Robert Bloch
1960s English-language films
1960s British films